Stefanie Berset (born c. 1996), is a Swiss curler from Bern. She currently plays second on Team Michèle Jäggi.

Career
Berset played for the Jana Stritt rink in juniors, but never was able to win the Swiss Junior Curling Championships. When she aged out of juniors, she joined the Binia Feltscher rink for the 2018–19 season. She and Larissa Hari replaced Franziska Kaufmann who had retired from competitive curling and Irene Schori who formed her own team. Carole Howald moved from lead to third.

Team Feltscher had a pretty successful first year together although they didn't win any events. They made the finals at the Women's Masters Basel and the Swiss Women's Curling Championship and finished fourth at the Schweizer Cup. They also had five quarterfinal appearances including qualifying at the 2018 Tour Challenge Tier 2 Grand Slam of Curling event. They ended their season at the 2019 WCT Arctic Cup but failed to advance to the playoffs.

The Feltscher rink had a slow start to the 2019–20 season, failing to make the playoffs in their first four events. They made the quarterfinals of the 2019 Tour Challenge Tier 2 slam event and finished third at both the 2019 Changan Ford International Curling Elite and the Schweizer Cup. They picked it up in the second half of the season however, qualifying in every event. They placed third at the 2020 Swiss Women's Curling Championship. Binia Feltscher retired from competitive curling at the end of the season and the team disbanded.

Berset and Howald joined the Irene Schori rink for the 2020–21 season. The team competed in two tour events during the abbreviated season, finishing third at the 2020 Schweizer Cup and reaching the quarterfinals of the 2020 Women's Masters Basel. Team Schori was one of four teams to compete in the 2021 Swiss Women's Curling Championship, where they finished in last place with a 2–7 record after the triple round robin.

To begin the 2021–22 season, Team Schori was invited to compete alongside the men's teams at the 2021 Baden Masters. There, they finished with a 1–3 record, only beating Magnus Nedregotten of Norway. Elsewhere on tour, they won the Part II Bistro Ladies Classic over Cathy Auld and made it to two other event finals. They lost to Eve Muirhead in the final of The Challenger and to Nora Wüest in the St. Galler Elite Challenge final. They also had playoff appearances at the 2021 Women's Masters Basel, Stu Sells Toronto Tankard and the DeKalb Superspiel. Team Schori competed in one Grand Slam event, the 2021 National, where they finished with a winless 0–3 record. The team finished their season with a 2–3 record at the 2022 Swiss Women's Curling Championship, not advancing to the second round. Third Carole Howald left the team following the season. Berset, Irene Schori and Lara Stocker then added Michèle Jäggi and Sarah Müller to their team for the 2022–23 season. Jäggi took over the team at skip with Schori at third, Berset playing second, Müller at lead and Stocker as the alternate.

Teams

References

External links

Swiss female curlers
Living people
1996 births
Sportspeople from Bern
People from Langenthal